Métodos de Placer Instantáneo is the fourth studio album recorded by Mexican singer-songwriter Aleks Syntek. It was released by EMI Televisa Music on February 9, 2010. The first single "Loca" was the opening theme of the Mexican telenovela Los Exitosos Perez. The music would be performed by RBD but was abandoned. The album received a 2010 Latin Grammy Award nomination for Best Male Pop Vocal Album.

Track listing

Special edition

Official remixes

iTunes

Certifications

References

2010 albums
Aleks Syntek albums
Spanish-language albums
EMI Televisa Music albums